Laurel Run is a tributary of Little Muncy Creek in Columbia County and Lycoming County, in Pennsylvania, in the United States. It is classified as a Coldwater Fishery and a Migratory Fishery. A number of bridges have been constructed over the stream.

Course
Laurel Run begins in the Muncy Hills in Madison Township, Columbia County. It flows east-northeast for several tenths of a mile, heading through a small valley as it enters Pine Township, where it receives two unnamed tributaries from the right. The stream then gradually turns north-northwest for several tenths of a mile before entering Franklin Township, Lycoming County, where it receives one unnamed tributary from the left and one from the right. It then turns north for several tenths of a mile before receiving an unnamed tributary from the right. The stream then heads west through a larger valley alongside Pennsylvania Route 442, receiving one unnamed tributary from the left and two from the right before entering Moreland Township.

In Moreland Township, Laurel Run receives two more unnamed tributaries from the right before turning south for a few tenths of a mile as Pennsylvania Route 442 turns away. It then turns northwest for several tenths of a mile, receiving one unnamed tributary from the left and two from the right before continuing to flow alongside Route 442.  The stream turns west for several tenths of a mile, receiving one unnamed tributary from the right and one from the left before turning west-southwest for some distance. It receives two more unnamed tributaries from the left before reaching its confluence with Little Muncy Creek.

Geography and geology

Watershed and biology
The mouth of the stream is in the United States Geological Survey quadrangle of Hughesville. However, its source is in the quadrangle of Lairdsville. It joins Little Muncy Creek near Moreland. Laurel Run is one of the major streams in Moreland Township, Lycoming County, as well as the southern portion of Franklin Township, Lycoming County.

Laurel Run is classified as a Coldwater Fishery and a Migratory Fishery, as are all of the other tributaries of Little Muncy Creek.

History
Laurel Run was entered into the Geographic Names Information System on August 2, 1979. Its identifier in the Geographic Names Information System is 1179018.

Christopher Derr and Thomas Taggert were among the earliest settlers in the vicinity of Laurel Run.

See also
Shepman Run, next tributary of Little Muncy Creek going downstream
Broad Run (Little Muncy Creek), next tributary of Little Muncy Creek going upstream
List of rivers of Pennsylvania

References

Tributaries of Muncy Creek
Rivers of Pennsylvania